Leo Suter (born 26 September 1993) is an English actor.

Biography
Suter was born in London, and educated at Colet Court, St Paul's School, and New College, Oxford, where he read Human Sciences.

He began acting while studying in school at the age of eleven. He signed his first professional acting contract after playing in his school final play. His theatre roles included Patsy in The Winterling by Oxford Playhouse, Subtle in The Alchemist by Arcola Theatre, and Mercutio in Romeo and Juliet by Southwark Playhouse. 

Suter plays Harald Sigurdsson in the Netflix series Vikings: Valhalla (2022-present) directed by Jeb Stuart.

Filmography

Films

Television

References

External links
Leo Suter instagram
Leo Suter on IMDB

1993 births
Living people
21st-century English male actors
English male film actors
English male stage actors
Place of birth missing (living people)